Dirinastrum is a lichenized genus of fungi in the family Roccellaceae.

References

Roccellaceae
Lichen genera
Taxa named by Johannes Müller Argoviensis